Statistics of Swedish football Division 3 for the 1960 season.

League standings

Norra Norrland 1960

Mellersta Norrland 1960

Södra Norrland 1960

Norra Svealand 1960

Östra Svealand 1960

Västra Svealand 1960

Nordöstra Götaland 1960

Nordvästra Götaland 1960

Mellersta Götaland 1960

Sydöstra Götaland 1960

Sydvästra Götaland 1960

Södra Götaland 1960

Footnotes

References 

Swedish Football Division 3 seasons
3
Swed
Swed